After the February Revolution of 1917 in Russia, ethnic Yakuts began politically organizing and forming their own local committees. Following the Bolshevik seizure of power during the October Revolution of 1917, the Yakut committees were merged into an anti-Bolshevik autonomous regional administration, the "Yakut Committee to Safeguard the Revolution". After the formal proclamation of the Russian Soviet Republic in January 1918, the Committee declared the independence of Yakutia in reaction to these events. This independent government was overthrown on July 1 by the intervention of Soviet troops from Irkutsk.

References

Anti-Bolshevik uprisings
Rebellions in Russia
1918 in Russia
Conflicts in 1918
Sakha Republic
Former unrecognized countries
1918 in Asia
History of the Russian Far East
Post–Russian Empire states